Patrick William Rucker (5 May 1900 – 20 May 1940) was an English first-class cricketer and British Army officer.

Rucker was born at Chislehurst in May 1900. He was educated at Charterhouse School, before going up to Brasenose College, Oxford. While studying at Oxford, he played first-class cricket for Oxford University in 1919. In his debut match against the Gentlemen of England at Oxford, he bowled the first delivery in first-class cricket since the 1918 Armistice and the first since the suspension of first-class cricket in 1914. He made seven first-class appearances for Oxford in 1919, which included playing in The University Match against Cambridge. He took 11 wickets with his left-arm medium pace bowling, at an average of 42.00 and best figures of 4 for 107.

Rucker married Betty Fairweather at High Wycombe in 1927. He later served in the Second World War, being commissioned as a second lieutenant in the Royal Sussex Regiment in November 1939. He fought during the Battle of France in May 1940, travelling to Amiens via Abbeville and Lens, all the while the regiment was harassed by Luftwaffe dive-bombers. On 20 May, his battalion was attacked at Amiens by a motorcycle battalion of the 1st Panzer Division, during which Rucker was killed in action. He is commemorated at the Dunkirk Memorial. His brother, Robin, was killed during the First World War in service with the Royal Air Force, while another brother, Charles, also fought in the First World War and played first-class cricket.

References

External links

1900 births
1940 deaths
Military personnel from Kent
People from Chislehurst
People educated at Charterhouse School
Alumni of University College, Oxford
English cricketers
Oxford University cricketers
Royal Sussex Regiment officers
British Army personnel killed in World War II